The 2019 FIFA U-17 World Cup was the 18th edition of the FIFA U-17 World Cup, the biennial international men's youth football championship contested by the under-17 national teams of the member associations of FIFA. It was hosted by Brazil between 26 October and 17 November 2019.

Originally, it was determined that Peru would have hosted the tournament between 5 and 27 October 2019, however, it was announced in February 2019 that they would no longer host the tournament, following inspection of the facilities and concern over organizational challenges. A formal announcement on 15 March 2019 ratified the recommendation to move the tournament to Brazil. With the ratification to name Brazil as host, this marked the country's first time to host a FIFA youth competition, having previously hosted the senior World Cup twice as well as the 2000 FIFA Club World Championship, the 2008 FIFA Futsal World Cup, the 2013 FIFA Confederations Cup, and numerous editions of the FIFA Beach Soccer World Cup.

England were the defending champions, but unable to defend their title after being eliminated in the group stages at the 2019 UEFA European Under-17 Championship in the Republic of Ireland. England became the second consecutive title holders that failed to qualify. Brazil won their fourth U-17 World Cup title, winning 2–1 against Mexico in the final, which was also the first time in the history that Brazil won a FIFA World Cup tournament at home soil.

Host selection 
The bidding process to host the 2019 FIFA U-20 World Cup and the 2019 FIFA U-17 World Cup was launched by FIFA in June 2017. A member association may bid for both tournaments, but they would be awarded to different hosts.

Original round of bidding 
Two countries publicly declared their formal bids to host the tournament.

 (withdrawn)

On 8 March 2018, Rwanda withdrew its bid to host the tournament due to time and logistic aspects. FIFA then unanimously announced Peru as the host country after the FIFA Council meeting on 16 March 2018 in Bogotá, Colombia.

Second round of bidding 
On 22 February 2019, FIFA announced that the tournament would be moved to a yet-to-be-determined host after inspection visits found issues with the prepared infrastructure and organization in Peru. On the same day, FIFA Secretary-General Fatma Samoura sent a letter to the Brazilian Football Confederation to determine if the tournament could be held in that country, and the answer was positive. CONMEBOL reinforced the idea by claiming that, because of the preparation for the 2019 Copa América, which was scheduled to start in less than four months, Brazil would be the only one able to make the commitment in such a short time. With the change of venue, the tournament was delayed by three weeks. Brazil was confirmed as the new host by the FIFA Council on 15 March 2019. However, of all the stadiums that were chosen to host the Copa América 2019 games were not used as all the venues were used as training venues by the participant's national squads.

Qualified teams 
A total of 24 teams qualified for the final tournament. Brazil as host team along with 23 other teams qualified from six separate continental competitions. The slot allocation was approved by the FIFA Council on 10 June 2018.

Notes

Venues 
The tournament used four venues in three cities.

Organization

Emblem 
The official emblem was unveiled on 10 July 2019 ahead of the draw. The emblem takes its inspiration from the country's rich history and diverse landscapes, with a variety of distinctive elements coming together to form the shape of the tournament trophy. The base evokes the lush green of Brazil's natural scenery. Sweeping vegetation leads the viewer's eye past the intense reds of the Brazilian soil and yellowy orange of the country's world-famous gemstones towards a celebratory figure. That figure, in turn, reaches towards a ball, the design of which is inspired by the iconic curved columns of Cathedral of Brasília, a masterpiece by renowned Brazilian architect Oscar Niemeyer.

Draw and schedule 
The match schedule was unveiled on 10 July 2019, the day before the final draw. The kick-off times were confirmed on 25 July 2019.

The final draw was held on 11 July 2019, 15:00 CEST (UTC+2), at the FIFA headquarters in Zurich, Switzerland. The 24 teams were drawn into six groups of four teams. Hosts Brazil were automatically seeded into Pot 1 and assigned to position A1, while the remaining teams were seeded into their respective pots based on their results in the last five FIFA U-17 World Cups (more recent tournaments weighted more heavily), with bonus points awarded to confederation champions. Teams from Pot 1 were drawn first, followed by Pot 2, Pot 3, and finally Pot 4, with each team (apart from Brazil) also drawn to one of the positions within their group. No group could contain more than one team from each confederation.

Match officials 
A total of 20 refereeing trios (a referee and two assistant referees), 5 support referees, and 17 video assistant referees were appointed for the tournament.

Squads 

Players born on or after 1 January 2002 and on or before 31 December 2004 were eligible to compete in the tournament.

Each team had to name a preliminary squad of between 22 and 50 players. From the preliminary squad, the team had to name a final squad of 21 players (three of whom must be goalkeepers) by the FIFA deadline. Players in the final squad could be replaced by a player from the preliminary squad due to serious injury or illness up to 24 hours prior to kickoff of the team's first match.

Group stage 

The top two teams of each group and the four best third-placed teams advanced to the round of 16.

All times are local, BRT (UTC−3).

Tiebreakers 
The ranking of teams in the group stage was determined as follows:

 Points obtained in all group matches (three points for a win, one for a draw, none for a defeat);
 Goal difference in all group matches;
 Number of goals scored in all group matches;
 Points obtained in the matches played between the teams in question;
 Goal difference in the matches played between the teams in question;
 Number of goals scored in the matches played between the teams in question;
 Fair play points in all group matches (only one deduction could be applied to a player in a single match): 
 Drawing of lots.

Group A

Group B

Group C

Group D

Group E

Group F

Ranking of third-placed teams 
The four best third-placed teams from the six groups advance to the knockout stage along with the six group winners and six runners-up.

In the next stage the four third-placed teams will be matched with the winners of groups A, B, C, and D according to the tournament regulations.

Knockout stage 
In the knockout stage, if a match is level at the end of 90 minutes of normal playing time, the match would be directly decided by a penalty shoot-out to determine the winner; no extra time would be played.

In the round of 16, the four third-placed teams would be matched with the winners of groups A, B, C, and D. The specific match-ups involving the third-placed teams depend on which four third-placed teams qualified for the round of 16:

Bracket

Round of 16

Quarter-finals

Semi-finals

Third place match

Final

Awards 
The following awards were given at the conclusion of the tournament. They were all sponsored by Adidas, except for the FIFA Fair Play Trophy

Goalscorers

See also 
2019 Copa América

References

External links 

 
2019
2019 in Brazilian football
2019 in youth association football
International association football competitions hosted by Brazil
October 2019 sports events in South America
November 2019 sports events in South America